Events in the year 1671 in Norway.

Incumbents
Monarch: Christian V

Events
Agdesiden amt was divided into Lister og Mandals amt and Nedenæs amt.
The city of Laurvig (currently Larvik) was founded by Ulrik Fredrik Gyldenløve, the first count of Laurvig.

Arts and literature

Births

Deaths

See also

References